Vanessa Hessler (born January 21, 1988) is an Italian-American model and actress. A model since she was 15, Hessler has appeared in many publications throughout Italy, Germany and France.

Early life
Daughter of an Italian mother and an American father, Hessler lived in Rome until she was 8, then moved to Washington, D.C., her father's birthplace. She lived in Rockville, Maryland in her early teenage years. In 2002 she returned to Italy. She speaks Italian, English and French.

Career

Modeling
Hessler worked for Donna sotto le stelle and Notte Mediterranea, both on TV. In 2004, she was chosen for a Korff's advertising campaign and for Alta Roma Alta Moda, the Rome fashion week.

She lives in Rome and Washington D.C., and appeared in commercials for Baby Star, Nara Camicie and Gilli.

Hessler planned to work in television, and in early 2006 she wanted to replace Alessia Marcuzzi to host Le Iene, but lost to Cristina Chiabotto.

Hessler has appeared in advertising for GUESS, Calvin Klein, Giorgio Armani, L'Oréal, and Ferrero SpA. In February 2010, Vanessa walked for the Fall 2010 Prada show in Milan,

In March 2006, she made her debut as a TV show host at the Festival di Sanremo with Claudia Cedro, Francesca Lancini, and Marta Cecchetto.

Controversy
Hessler was the face of the DSL brand "Alice" (a service of Telefónica Europe) in both Germany and France until late October 2011. Telefónica Europe decided to terminate her contract due to her personal connections to, and public support for, the deposed Gaddafi family stating that she had "failed to distance herself from her comments on the conflict in Libya."
Hessler said that she had a "very beautiful love story" over a four-year period with Mutassim Gaddafi, one of the sons of Muammar Gaddafi, who was killed with his father following a U.N.-sanctioned airstrike and rebel ambush on Gaddafi's convoy in Libya. Hessler also stated the West had made a mistake in backing the rebels who ended Muammar Gaddafi's 42-year reign. "We, France and the United Kingdom, financed the rebels but people don't know what they are doing," Hessler told Italian magazine Diva e Donna, adding that she is disgusted by what is happening in Libya and that "the Gaddafi family is not how they are being depicted, they are normal people".

Acting
Hessler appeared in the 2005 film Christmas in Miami (Italian: Natale a Miami), along with Christian De Sica, and consequently her popularity soared. She plays Greek princess, Irina, in the 2008 Asterix at the Olympic Games (French: Astérix aux Jeux Olympiques), a film that also stars Clovis Cornillac, Alain Delon, and Gérard Depardieu. She also plays the leading female role in Per una notte d'amore (English: For a Night of Love), which was filmed in Italy and released in 2008 as a two-part TV special, likewise in Cenerentola (2011) and Le mille e una notte: Aladino e Sherazade (English: One Thousand and One Nights), a similar project.

Film

References

External links

 
 
 

1988 births
Living people
Italian emigrants to the United States
Italian female models
American actresses
American people of Italian descent
American female models
Italian showgirls
Italian people of German descent
Actresses from Rome
21st-century American women